

People's Republic of China
This is a list of the first-level administrative divisions of the People's Republic of China (PRC), including all provinces, autonomous regions, special administrative regions and municipalities, in order of their highest points. Taiwan Province, the territory of which is administered by the Republic of China but claimed by the People's Republic of China, is included for comparison purposes.

Territorial claims without actual administration. Yushan is on the border of Kaohsiung City, Nantou County and Chiayi County of the Republic of China.

References
National Bureau of Statistics

Highest point
Geography of China
Highest point
Lists of highest points in Asia

Lists of mountains of China